Charles Frank Milstead (November 21, 1937 – February 17, 2022) was an American professional football player who was a quarterback and defensive back for the Houston Oilers of the American Football League (AFL).  He played college football at Texas A&M University and was drafted in the fourteenth round of the 1960 NFL Draft by the Washington Redskins.

Career
Milstead played 22 games in his career, having minimal time as quarterback while spending time as a punter and defensive back. He threw seven career passes and had four total completions and 43 yards. On defense, he had two interceptions. On rushing, he ran for three yards on three carries. He had 66 punts for 2,365 yards for a 35.8 yard average. His punts and punt yards were both fourth in the league for 1960.

Personal life and death
He died on February 17, 2022, at the age of 84.

References

1937 births
2022 deaths
American football defensive backs
American football quarterbacks
Houston Oilers players
Texas A&M Aggies football players
Sportspeople from Tyler, Texas
Players of American football from Texas
American Football League players